Fleener may refer to:

Places
Fleener, Indiana

Other uses
Fleener (surname)